Hibbertia arnhemica is a species of flowering plant in the family Dilleniaceae and is endemic to Arnhem Land in the Northern Territory. It is an erect shrub with hairy branchlets, egg-shaped or elliptic leaves and spikes of eight to fifteen yellow flowers, each with twenty to thirty stamens arranged on one side of the two carpels.

Description
Flowering occurs in most months.

Taxonomy
Hibbertia arnhemica was first formally described in 1991 by Sally T. Reynolds in the journal Austrobaileya from specimens collected by Mike Lazarides near Mount Howship near the East Alligator River in 1972. The specific epithet (arnhemica) refers to the area where this species is endemic.

Distribution and habitat
This hibbertia grows in woodland on permanently wet, sandy soil in Arnhem Land.

Conservation status
Goodenia arnhemica is classified as of "least concern" under the Northern Territory Government Territory Parks and Wildlife Conservation Act 1976.

See also
List of Hibbertia species

References

arnhemica
Flora of the Northern Territory
Plants described in 1991